Sea Shanties is the debut album of English rock band High Tide. It was one of the first albums to use violin as a rock instrument.  The cover artwork was drawn by Paul Whitehead.

Production
Denny Gerrard (of Warm Sounds) produced Sea Shanties in return for High Tide acting as the backing band on his solo album Sinister Morning. The recording sessions for the two albums overlapped, with Sinister Morning being finished in late June 1969, and Sea Shanties being started on the 2nd of that month.

Reception

Though it met with a scathing review in Melody Maker, reviews in the underground press were universally positive, and sales were just enough to convince Liberty to give the green light to a second album.

The AllMusic retrospective review by Wilson Neate stated "On Sea Shanties, there's nothing fey and flowery in Hill's bleak lyrics or his doomy Jim Morrison-like delivery, and psychedelia's melodic whimsy is supplanted by a physicality more in line with the visceral heft of metal progenitors...High Tide weren't a power trio, though, and it was the interplay of Hill's guitar with Simon House's violin that created the band's unique signature. Showing that rock violin needn't be a marginal adornment, House whips up an aggressive edge that rivals the guitar... High Tide had the muscularity of a no-nonsense proto-metal band, but they also ventured into prog territory with changing time signatures and tempos, soft-hard dynamics, multi-part arrangements, and even some ornate faux-Baroque interludes... Far from the collection of nautical ditties its name suggests, Sea Shanties is an overlooked gem encapsulating the shifting musical currents in late-'60s British rock."

It was voted number 5 in the All-Time 50 Long Forgotten Gems from Colin Larkin's All Time Top 1000 Albums.

Track listing
All tracks written by Tony Hill except where noted.

2006 Remaster Bonus Tracks

Personnel 
High Tide
Roger Hadden - drums
Tony Hill - guitar, acoustic guitar, vocals
Simon House - violin, organ
Peter Pavli - bass

References 

1969 debut albums
High Tide (band) albums
Liberty Records albums
albums recorded at Olympic Sound Studios